Two concordats were signed in 1817:

Concordat of 24 October 1817, with Bavaria
Concordat of 11 June 1817, with France.